Samúel Kári Friðjónsson (born 22 February 1996) is an Icelandic professional footballer who plays as a midfielder for Super League Greece club Atromitos and the Iceland national team.

Club career

Reading
Samúel joined Reading in March 2013 to train with the club before his two-year contract with the club began on 1 July 2013. Samúel extended his contract with Reading for another year on 22 May 2015. On 9 May 2016, Reading announced that Samúel's contract would not be renewed and that he would become a free agent at the end of his contract on 30 June 2016.

Vålerenga
On 16 June 2016, Samúel signed a three-and-a-half year contract with Vålerenga, to start on 1 July 2016 when his Reading contract expired.

Samúel made his debut for Vålerenga on 2 July 2017, coming on as a 65th-minute substitute for Bård Finne in Vålerenga's 0–0 away draw against Brann.

Viking (loan)
On 30 January 2019, Samúel joined Viking on loan until the end of the 2019 season.

SC Paderborn
On 18 January 2020, SC Paderborn announced the signing of Samúel on a contract until 30 June 2022.

Viking
Samúel rejoined Viking in October 2020, having agreed the termination of his contract with SC Paderborn. He signed a contract until 2022.

International career
Samúel represented the Icelandic U-17 national team on 11 occasions between 2011 and 2012, scoring twice, with his debut coming on 2 August 2011, in a 3–1 win over Sweden U-17. Samúel went on to represent the U-19 team twenty times between 2013 and 2014, scoring three times, with his debut coming in a 1–1 home draw against Denmark. On 26 March 2015, Samúel made his debut for the U-21 team in their 3–0 defeat to Romania. Samúel made his debut for Iceland on 11 January 2018 in an unofficial friendly against Indonesia Selection.

Samúel was called up to Iceland's 23-man squad for the 2018 FIFA World Cup on 11 May 2018.

Career statistics

Club

International

Honours
Viking
 Norwegian Football Cup: 2019

References

1996 births
Living people
Samuel Fridjonsson
Association football midfielders
Reading F.C. players
Samuel Fridjonsson
Vålerenga Fotball players
Viking FK players
SC Paderborn 07 players
Samuel Fridjonsson
Atromitos F.C. players
English Football League players
Eliteserien players
Norwegian Second Division players
Bundesliga players
Super League Greece players
Samuel Fridjonsson
Samuel Fridjonsson
Samuel Fridjonsson
Samuel Fridjonsson
Samuel Fridjonsson
Samuel Fridjonsson
Expatriate footballers in Norway
Expatriate footballers in England
Expatriate footballers in Germany
Expatriate footballers in Greece
2018 FIFA World Cup players
Samuel Fridjonsson
Samuel Fridjonsson